Galerie Philia is an international contemporary design and art gallery with locations in Mexico, Geneva, New York, and Singapore.

Background 
Galerie Philia was founded in 2015 by the Attali brothers. Philia derives from ancient Greek word and means “friendship” or “affection”. The gallery organizes permanent and temporary exhibitions by national and international artists.

In 2021, Galerie Philia opened an exhibition at Walker Tower in New York, designed by Pietro Franceschini.

In 2022, Galerie Philia launched “Art Brut”, a sculpture workshop for young children in Breil-sur-Roya. In the same year, the gallery opened the exhibition Jean Nouvel: Racines Aériennes, designed by Jean Nouvel. It was the first time that a private residence designed by Jean Nouvel was used for an art and design exhibition. Galerie Philia presented a design exhibition at Cité radieuse de Marseille, featuring works by designers such as Rick Owens.

In 2023, Pilar Zeta and Andrés Monnier present ‘Antipodes’ rock sculptures at Galerie Philia, during the Mexico City Art Week.

During the Milan Design Week 2023, Galerie Philia will present Desacralized, an exhibition on the theme of 'desacralisation', in the Chiesa di San Vittore e Quaranta martiri, located in the centre of Milan.

References

External links 

 Official website

Contemporary art galleries in the United States
Contemporary art galleries in Mexico